Xu Jiansheng (1912–1993) was a People's Republic of China politician. He was born in Shibaxiang, Bijie, Guizhou Province. He served as vice-governor and CPPCC Committee Chairman of his home province. He was a delegate to the 1st National People's Congress, 2nd National People's Congress, 3rd National People's Congress and 7th National People's Congress.

References

1912 births
1993 deaths
People's Republic of China politicians from Guizhou
Chinese Communist Party politicians from Guizhou
Political office-holders in Guizhou
Vice-governors of Guizhou
Delegates to the 1st National People's Congress
Delegates to the 2nd National People's Congress
Delegates to the 3rd National People's Congress
Delegates to the 7th National People's Congress